The following is a list of Teen Choice Award winners and nominees for Choice Music – Country Artist. Formally awarded as three separate categories from 2010 to 2014: Choice Music – Country Group, Choice Music – Male Country Artist and Choice Music – Female Country Artist. Beginning in 2015, the country genre was condensed from three categories to one, renamed Choice Country Artist. Taylor Swift and Lady Antebellum are the most awarded artists in this category with five wins each.

Winners and nominees

2010s

Records
Lady Antebellum has won the most times for Choice Music - Country Group, with five wins. Hunter Hayes has won the most times for Choice Music - Male  Country Artist, taking home three wins. Taylor Swift has won the most times for Choice Music - Female Country Artist, with five consecutive wins. Carrie Underwood has won the most times for Choice Country Artist, with four consecutive wins.

References

Country music awards
Country Artist